FK Pirmasens is a German association football club in Pirmasens, Rhineland-Palatinate. The team was formed as the football section of the gymnastics and sports club TV Pirminia Pirmasens in 1903 and became independent in 1914. They took on their current name in 1925. FK is one of the few teams that uses the German Klub in their name as opposed to the commonly affected English-style term Club.

History

The club developed into a strong amateur side in southwestern Germany. In post-First World War play, the club was grouped in the tier-one Kreisliga Saar in 1919 but then moved to the Kreisliga Pfalz in 1920. From 1930 to 1933 the team made three consecutive appearances in the final of the Southern German championship, on the strength of four Bezirksliga Rhein-Saar titles, and between 1934 and 1936 were three times vice-champions of the Gauliga Südwest, one of sixteen top flight divisions formed in the re-organization of German football under the Third Reich. World War II was hard on the club: following a 0–26 beating at the hands of 1. FC Kaiserslautern in 1942 they withdrew from competition until after the conflict. After the war the club played in the Oberliga Südwest and captured league titles there in 1958, 1959 and 1960 while finishing as vice champions in 1954 and 1962. The club was so popular at the time that they often had to abandon their home ground in favour of the stadium in nearby Ludwigshafen in order to accommodate crowds of up to 65,000 spectators.

After the formation of the Bundesliga, Germany's new professional league, in 1963 Pirmasens found themselves in the second division Regionalliga Südwest where they consistently finished in the upper half of the league table over the course of the next decade. While they had several opportunities to advance to the Bundesliga through the promotion rounds they were unsuccessful. By the mid-1970s the club was faltering. They narrowly missed relegation in 1977, only staying up because rival SV Völklingen was denied a license. However, by 1980 they found themselves in the Amateur Oberliga Südwest (III), slipped to the Verbandsliga Südwest by 1993, and just two seasons later were playing in the Landesliga Südwest (VI). The club has recovered nicely and climbed as high as the third division Regionalliga Süd in 2006–07.

In 2006, the club stunned German football when they defeated Werder Bremen in the first round of the DFB-Pokal in a penalty shootout.

Since 2007 the club played in the Oberliga Südwest where the team has achieved good results, coming second in 2010 and 2011. From 2012–13 the Oberliga Südwest was renamed Oberliga Rheinland-Pfalz/Saar, with FKP continuing in this league. The club won the championship in 2014 and earned promotion to the Regionalliga Südwest.

Reserve team
The club's reserve team, FK Pirmasens II, achieved its greatest success in 2014–15 when it won promotion to the Oberliga Rheinland-Pfalz/Saar.

Current squad

Honours
The club's honours:

League
 Oberliga Südwest (I)
 Champions: 1958, 1959, 1960
 Runners-up: 1954, 1962
 Bezirksliga Rhein-Saar (Saar division) (I)
 Champions: 1930, 1931, 1932, 1933
 Regionalliga Südwest (II)
 Champions: 1966
 2nd Bundesliga Süd (II)
 Runners-up: 1975
 Oberliga Südwest (IV)
 Champions: 1999, 2006
 Oberliga Rheinland-Pfalz/Saar (V)
 Champions: 2014
 Verbandsliga Südwest (V)
 Champions: 1997, 2015‡

Cup
 South West Cup
 Winners: 1999, 2006

 ‡ Denotes won by reserve team.

Recent seasons
The recent season-by-season performance of the club:

 With the introduction of the Regionalligas in 1994 and the 3. Liga in 2008 as the new third tier, below the 2. Bundesliga, all leagues below dropped one tier.

Key

Famous players
Heinz Kubsch, played for West Germany's 1954 World Cup winning Miracle of Bern side.

References

External links
Official website 
The Abseits Guide to German Soccer
 FK Pirmasens at Weltfussball.de
 Das deutsche Fußball-Archiv historical German domestic league tables 

 
Football clubs in Germany
Football clubs in Rhineland-Palatinate
Association football clubs established in 1903
1903 establishments in Germany
Pirmasens
2. Bundesliga clubs